The 1991–92 Primeira Divisão was the 58th edition of top flight of Portuguese football. It started on 18 August 1991 with a match between Desp. Chaves and Estoril, and ended on 16 May 1992. The league was contested by 18 clubs with Benfica as the defending champions.

Porto qualified for the 1992–93 UEFA Champions League first round, Boavista qualified for the 1992–93 European Cup Winners' Cup first round, and Benfica, Sporting CP and Vitória de Guimarães qualified for the 1992–93 UEFA Cup first round; in opposite, Torreense, Penafiel and União da Madeira were relegated to the Liga de Honra. Ricky was the top scorer with 30 goals.

Promotion and relegation

Teams relegated to Liga de Honra
Tirsense
Vitória de Setúbal|
Estrela da Amadora
Belenenses
Nacional

Tirsense, Vitória de Setúbal, Estrela da Amadora, Belenenses and Nacional were consigned to the Liga de Honra following their final classification in 1990-91 season where five teams were relegated due to the reduction of teams.

Teams promoted from Liga de Honra
Paços de Ferreira
Estoril
Torreense

The other five teams were replaced by Paços de Ferreira, Estoril and Torreense from the Liga de Honra.

Teams

Stadia and locations

Managerial changes

League table

Results

Top goalscorers

Source: Foradejogo

Footnotes

External links
 Portugal 1991-92 - RSSSF (Jorge Miguel Teixeira)
 Portuguese League 1991/92 - footballzz.co.uk
 Portugal - Table of Honor - Soccer Library 

Primeira Liga seasons
Port
1991–92 in Portuguese football